Ouzinkie (in Alutiiq), is a hamlet on Spruce Island in Kodiak Island Borough, Alaska, United States. At the 2010 census the population was 161, down from 225 in 2000.

Geography
Ouzinkie is located at  (57.923, -152.502).

Climate

Demographics

Ouzinkie first appeared on the 1880 U.S. Census as the unincorporated village of "Oozinkie." All 45 of its residents were Creole (Mixed Russian and Alaskan Native). In 1890, it reported as "Uzinkee" and included Yelovoi Village. All 74 residents were Creole. It did not appear again until 1920 when it reported as "Ouzinkee." In 1950, the name was changed to "Uzinki." In 1967, it was incorporated as Ouzinkie, and has returned under that name in every census since 1970.

As of the census of 2000, there were 225 people, 74 households, and 56 families residing in the hamlet. There were 86 housing units at an average density of 14.3 per square mile (5.5/km2). The racial makeup of the hamlet was 11.11% White, 80.89% Native American, and 8.00% from two or more races.  4.44% of the population were Hispanic or Latino of any race.

There were 74 households, out of which 44.6% had children under the age of 18 living with them, 51.4% were married couples living together, 20.3% had a female householder with no husband present, and 24.3% were non-families. 21.6% of all households were made up of individuals, and 6.8% had someone living alone who was 65 years of age or older.  The average household size was 3.04 and the average family size was 3.52.

In the hamlet the age distribution of the population shows 36.4% under the age of 18, 6.7% from 18 to 24, 20.4% from 25 to 44, 27.6% from 45 to 64, and 8.9% who were 65 years of age or older.  The median age was 33 years. For every 100 females, there were 84.4 males.  For every 100 females age 18 and over, there were 90.7 males.

The median income for a household in the hamlet was $52,500, and the median income for a family was $54,375. Males had a median income of $38,333 versus $45,625 for females. The per capita income for the hamlet was $19,324.  About 6.1% of families and 6.0% of the population were below the poverty line, including 8.8% of those under the age of eighteen and 4.5% of those 65 or over.

Religion
One of the most unique features of Kodiak is Orthodox monasticism in America. Indeed, Saint Herman of Alaska, the member of the original Russian missionary team from Valaam Monastery and America’s first canonized Orthodox saint, had lived here for more than twenty years, until his death in 1836. Today two monastic communities—Saint Archangel Michael Skete for men and Saint Nilus Skete for women—live in close proximity to St. Herman’s hermitage and strive to follow St. Herman’s example of prayer, simplicity, and living off the land and sea. The two sketes, affiliated with Saint Herman of Alaska Monastery in Platina, California, are under the jurisdiction of Bishop Maksim Vasiljević of the Serbian Orthodox Church in North and South America.

Education
The Ouzinkie School, a K-12 rural school, is operated by the Kodiak Island Borough School District.

Public services 
In 2021, Ouzinkie became a part of the Energy Transitions Initiative Partnership Project via the Renewable Energy Alaska Project; the project will help the city (and several other remote villages in Alaska) develop renewable energy sources and increase its energy efficiency.

References

Further reading

 Mishler, Craig. Black Ducks & Salmon Bellies An Ethnography of Old Harbor and Ouzinkie, Alaska. Virginia Beach, Virginia: Donning Co. Pub, 2003. 

Cities in Alaska
Cities in Kodiak Island Borough, Alaska
Populated coastal places in Alaska on the Pacific Ocean